Wanda Nero Butler (born September 24, 1958 as Lawanda Marie Nero) is an American gospel musician. Her first album, Reach for His Love, was released by Sog Secret in 1987, and her second album, New Born Soul, was released by the label in 1989. The subsequent two albums, Wanda and Live in Atlanta, was released in 1991 by Light Records. She released, Chike-Anyabwille, All to the Glory of God, and Family Prayer, was released in 1994, 1996, and 1999 respectively by Sound of Gospel. All albums charted with the lone exception of Wanda on the Billboard magazine Gospel Albums chart.

Early life
Butler was born in Solano County, California, as Lawanda Marie Nero on September 24, 1958, whose father is Reverend Nero and her mother is Barbara Nero, whose maiden name was Fuller.

Music career
Her music recording career commenced in 1988, with the album, Reach for His Love, and it was released by Sog (Sound of Gospel) Secret, and it was her breakthrough album upon the Billboard magazine Gospel Albums chart at No. 34. The subsequent album, New Born Soul, was released by Sog Secret on January 11, 1990, and it placed upon the aforementioned chart at No. 11. She released, Wanda, with Light Records on July 1, 1991, yet this was her only album that failed to chart. Her fourth album, Live in Atlanta, was released by Light Records on August 29, 1991, and this peaked at No. 22 on the Gospel Albums chart. The album, Chike-Anyabwille, was released by Sound of Gospel on November 29, 1994, and it placed on the aforementioned chart at No. 11. She released, All to the Glory of God, on July 23, 1996 by Sound of Gospel, and this peaked at No. 12 on the Top Gospel Albums chart. The latest release, Family Prayer, released from Sound of Gospel on June 26, 1999 by Sound of Gospel, and this placed at No. 11 on the aforementioned chart.

Personal life
Butler is married to Reverend Zarak Butler, and together they have three children, who formerly resided in Detroit, Michigan, but presently reside in the Atlanta, Georgia area.

Discography

References

External links
 Official website

1958 births
Living people
African-American songwriters
African-American Christians
Musicians from California
Musicians from Atlanta
Musicians from Detroit
Songwriters from California
Songwriters from Georgia (U.S. state)
Songwriters from Michigan
People from Solano County, California
21st-century African-American people
20th-century African-American people